The Virginia War Memorial is a 1955 memorial in Richmond, Virginia, originally dedicated to Virginians killed in World War II and the Korean War. In 1980, the Shrine was enlarged to honor those Virginians killed in action in the Vietnam War.  In 1996, the names of Virginians killed in action during Desert Storm/Desert Shield were added.  Today, there are nearly 12,000 Virginians whose names are engraved on the Shrine of Memory's glass and stone walls.  Reflecting the different character of war today, Virginia has created a special Memorial Shrine to honor the over 250 Virginians killed in the Global War on Terrorism.

The Virginians at War documentary video series, combined with other efforts, significantly increased the War Memorial's public image in the local region and throughout the Commonwealth, and highlighted the message of the "Price of Freedom".  The Memorial added staff and volunteers to meet the increasing demand for its educational offerings and to assist with increased visitors to the Memorial.

With over 21,000 people from 45 states and 21 countries visiting the War Memorial in 2008, the facilities were stretched to the breaking point.  

In 2008, over 21,000 people from 45 states and 21 countries visited the memorial.  As a result of this influx of visitors, some groups were turned away as the single auditorium could not support multiple groups for meetings.  The Memorial is also used by active military personnel for events such as homecomings, re-enlistments, and promotions.

To alleviate the increasing demand on the facilities, an education center was planned to expand the educational opportunities and outreach for students and visitors, and to provide adequate visitor services.  A design was created to add an 18,000 square foot education center that would provide additional space to accommodate multiple groups and visitors.

Mission 
The Virginia War Memorial is the Commonwealth of Virginia's monument to honor the memory of Virginia's men and women who demonstrated a willingness to serve and fight to defend our way of life from World War II to the present; and through its Education Center, serves as the Center of Excellence for the Commonwealth in education of Virginian's experience of war from the birth of our nation to the present.  In its educational mission, the Virginia War Memorial will project a variety of internal and outreach programs, artifacts, research materials, Virginians at War documentaries, exhibitions, seminars, and ceremonies will be used to instill a living memorial to all citizens and citizen-warriors of the nation's commitment to freedom.

"Honoring our Veterans, Preserving our History, Educating our Youth, and Inspiring Patriotism in All."

Paul and Phyllis Galanti Education Center
In October 2007, the Memorial Trustees and Directors announced that a new education center would be named for two American heroes, Paul and Phyllis Galanti.  Each served the United States beyond the call of duty during and since the Vietnam War; Paul Galanti was a prisoner of war (POW) during the Vietnam War, and Phyllis Galanti organized efforts to obtain the release of her husband and other American POWs.  The Paul and Phyllis Galanti Education Center was dedicated on February 29, 2010, and features an amphitheater and an indoor theater.

Visiting Virginia War Memorial
Past the front doors there is a display cabinet full of battle coins in the memory of Claiborne G. Thomasson for his dedication and leadership in the United States Air Force 1963-1969.  There is display information for the American Revolution War, Mexican War, American Civil War, Spanish American War, World War I, and World War II, Korean War, and Vietnam War. Each one includes a timeline of the war. 

There are words hanging from the ceiling, which read: Sacrifice, Integrity, Discipline, Patriotism, Duty, Courage, and Loyalty. Those are all the qualities that you need to be a part of the army. Each word has the definition behind it. There are small displays of each war with uniforms and weapons and information talking about the war. There is a bulletin that of letters from the battlefield showcasing the range of emotions that soldiers faced.  Outside is the Veteran's Impact Project, which was a sculpture of various items that were symbolic to veterans and community members.

They have a Research Library, a display of guns and uniforms from the National Guard in World War I. They also had a piece of the West Wall of the Pentagon. On September 11, 2001, five terrorists hijacked American Airlines Flight 77 and intentionally crashed the plan into the west wall of the Pentagon in Arlington, Virginia, at 9:37 a.m. All sixty-four persons on the flight and 125 persons at the Pentagon were killed. The artifact is a section of the wall from the crash site. The damaged sections of the Pentagon were rebuilt and restored in 2002.

The exhibit honors and remembers those Americans. The next room, which was the Freedom Hall, which has the Wall of Honor; Virginia’s Heroes of the Global War on Terrorism. It had their pictures, rank, where they are from, where they served. It also has a display of Women in Naval Aviation, there were pictures and uniforms and helmets. 

Russell served in the Army Air Forces April 17, 1943. He was flying when he received a direct hit from ant-aircraft fire. The pilot ordered all the crewmen to bail out of the damaged Wabbits Twacks. Russell found that his escape door jammed and returned to the tail of the plane to release the tail gun dome. He climbed on the rear wing and held tight, and then he let go. Tumbling through space and releasing his chute. He fell backward, and the impact broke his back. He was captured by the German soldiers and spent 11 months in the German Prisoner of War camp. On his 95th birthday, the Virginia War Memorial saluted Russell Scott for his service, and years of being a volunteer at the Memorial. Still to this day, he comes every Wednesday and volunteer at the Virginia War Memorial.

References

External links
 Official website

Monuments and memorials in Virginia
Military monuments and memorials in the United States
Vietnam War monuments and memorials in the United States
World War I memorials in the United States
World War II memorials in the United States
Buildings and structures in Richmond, Virginia
History of Richmond, Virginia
Tourist attractions in Richmond, Virginia
Marble sculptures in Virginia
Buildings and structures completed in 1955
1955 sculptures
Afghanistan-Iraq War memorials
War in Afghanistan (2001–2021)
Iraq War
1955 establishments in Virginia